Luigi Lanzi (14 June 1732 – 30 March 1810) was an Italian art historian and archaeologist. When he died he was buried in the church of the Santa Croce at Florence by the side of Michelangelo.

Biography
Born in Treia, Lanzi was educated as a priest. He entered the Order of the Jesuits,  resided at Rome and in 1773 was appointed keeper of the galleries of Florence, where he became president of the Accademia della Crusca. He thereafter studied Italian painting and Etruscan antiquities and language. In the one field his labors are represented by his Storia Pittorica dell' Italia, the first portion of which, containing the Florentine, Sienese, Roman and Neapolitan schools, appeared in 1792, the rest in 1796.

In archaeology his great achievement was Saggio di lingua Etrusca (1789), followed by Saggio delle lingue d' Italia in 1806. In his 1806 memoir on the so-called Etruscan vases Dei vasi antichi dipinti volgarmente chiamati Etruschi, Lanzi rightly perceived their Greek origin and characters. What was true of the antiquities would be true also, he argued, of the Etruscan language, and the object of the Saggio di lingua Etrusca was to prove that this language must be related to that of the neighboring peoples: Romans, Umbrians, Oscans and Greeks.

He was allied with Ennio Quirino Visconti in his great but never accomplished plan of illustrating antiquity altogether from existing literature and monuments. His notices of ancient sculpture and its various styles appeared as an appendix to the Saggio di lingua Etrusca, and arose out of his minute study of the treasures then added to the Florentine collection from the Villa Medici. The abuse he met with from later writers on the Etruscan language led Corssen to protest in the name of his real services to philology and archaeology.

Among his other productions was an edition of Hesiod's Works and Days, with valuable notes, and a translation in terza rima. Begun in 1785, it was recast and completed in 1808. The list of his works closes with his Opere sacre, a series of treatises on spiritual subjects.

References

Elogio dell'abate L. Lanzi, By Onofrio Boni, Presso Niccolò Capurro, Pisa, (1816).
 Giulio Natali, "Nel primo centenario dalla morte di Luigi Lanzi", in Real deputazione di storia patria per le provincie delle Marche, atti e memorie, volume vi (N. S., Ancona, 1911)

Storia Pittorica dell' Italia (History of Painting in Italy; from the Period of the Revival of the Fine Arts to the End of the 18th-Century)

Sources

External links

 
 
 
 

1732 births
1810 deaths
People from the Province of Macerata
Italian archaeologists
Italian art historians
18th-century Italian Jesuits
Italian curators
Italian philologists